The Amanjaya Specialist Centre is a hospital that opened  in August 2014 in Sungai Petani in the Malaysian state of Kedah.  Funded in part by the Malaysian Federal government, it is reported as being the first hospital in Malaysia that will meet the "Green Building Index" criteria.

References

External links

Hospitals in Kedah
Hospitals established in 2014
2014 establishments in Malaysia